Euantha is a genus of bristle flies in the family Tachinidae.

Species
Euantha interrupta Aldrich, 1927
Euantha litturata (Olivier, 1811)
Euantha pulchra Wulp, 1891

References

Diptera of North America
Dexiinae
Tachinidae genera
Taxa named by Frederik Maurits van der Wulp